The 1981–82 season was the 80th season in which Dundee competed at a Scottish national level, playing in the Scottish Premier Division after being promoted the previous season. Dundee would finish in 8th place, remaining safe by 4 points. Dundee would also compete in both the Scottish League Cup and the Scottish Cup, where they would be knocked out in the group stage of the League Cup, and eliminated by Rangers in the quarter-finals of the Scottish Cup.

Scottish Premier Division 

Statistics provided by Dee Archive.

League table

Scottish League Cup 

Statistics provided by Dee Archive.

Group 2

Group 2 table

Scottish Cup 

Statistics provided by Dee Archive.

Player statistics 
Statistics provided by Dee Archive

|}

See also 

 List of Dundee F.C. seasons

References

External links 

 1981-82 Dundee season on Fitbastats

Dundee F.C. seasons
Dundee